Long Island Pond, also known as Little Island Pond,  is a  pond in Plymouth, Massachusetts. The pond is located in the eastern portion of The Pinehills development north of Great Island Pond and south of Beaver Dam Pond.

External links
Environmental Protection Agency
South Shore Coastal Watersheds - Lake Assessments

Ponds of Plymouth, Massachusetts
Ponds of Massachusetts